Garbage Daze Re-Regurgitated is the fourth album by American death metal band Exhumed. It is entirely composed of covers by artists that influenced Exhumed. The first album to feature bassist Leon del Muerte, guitarist Wes Caley and the only one to feature drummer Matt Connell.

The title is a reference to Metallica's The $5.98 E.P. - Garage Days Re-Revisited.

Track listing

Personnel
 Matt Harvey – guitars, vocals
 Leon del Muerte – bass, vocals
 Matt Connell – drums
 Wes Caley – guitars

Additional Personnel
 Bud Burke - guitar on ‘Trapped Under Ice’

Exhumed (band) albums
Covers albums
2005 albums